Paulo Henrique de Oliveira Alves (born 25 July 1996), known as Paulo Henrique, is a Brazilian footballer who plays as right-back for Vasco da Gama, on loan from Atlético Mineiro.

Club career

Londrina
Paulo Henrique was born in Sete Barras, São Paulo, and was a Londrina youth graduate. He made his first team debut on 16 March 2016, starting in a 1–0 away win against Parauapebas for the year's Copa do Brasil.

After being rarely used, Paulo Henrique served loans at Iraty, Operário Ferroviário, União Beltrão and Metropolitano.

Atlético Tubarão
On 1 August 2019, Paulo Henrique moved to Atlético Tubarão. He was an undisputed starter during the year's Copa Santa Catarina.

Paraná
On 10 January 2020, Paulo Henrique agreed to a deal with Série B side Paraná. After impressing with the club, he renewed his contract until December 2021 on 7 October.

Juventude
On 24 February 2021, Paulo Henrique was announced at Juventude, newly promoted to Série A. He made his top tier debut on 30 May, replacing Michel Macedo in a 2–2 away draw against Cuiabá.

A backup to Michel Macedo during his first year, Paulo Henrique became a starter in the 2022 season, despite playing some matches as a right midfielder.

Atlético Mineiro
On 3 January 2023, Paulo Henrique joined Atlético Mineiro on a two-year deal.

Loan to Vasco da Gama
On 25 February 2023, Paulo Henrique signed a season-long loan deal with Vasco da Gama.

Career statistics

Honours
Operário Ferroviário
 Campeonato Brasileiro Série D: 2017

Metropolitano
 Campeonato Catarinense Segunda Divisão: 2018

References

External links
Juventude profile 

1996 births
Living people
Footballers from São Paulo (state)
Brazilian footballers
Association football defenders
Campeonato Brasileiro Série A players
Campeonato Brasileiro Série B players
Londrina Esporte Clube players
Iraty Sport Club players
Operário Ferroviário Esporte Clube players
Clube Atlético Metropolitano players
Clube Atlético Tubarão players
Paraná Clube players
Esporte Clube Juventude players
Clube Atlético Mineiro players
CR Vasco da Gama players